Ayanna Soyini Pressley (born February 3, 1974) is an American politician who has served as the U.S. representative for Massachusetts's 7th congressional district since 2019. This district includes the northern three quarters of Boston, most of Cambridge, parts of Milton, as well as all of Chelsea, Everett, Randolph, and Somerville. Before serving in the United States House of Representatives, Pressley served as an at-large member of the Boston City Council from 2010 through 2019. She was elected to the United States House of Representatives in 2018 after she defeated the ten-term incumbent Mike Capuano in the Democratic primary election for Massachusetts' 7th congressional district and ran unopposed in the general election. Pressley was the first black woman elected to the Boston City Council and the first black woman elected to Congress from Massachusetts. Pressley is a member of "The Squad", a group of left-wing progressive congress members.

Early life and education 
Pressley was born in Cincinnati, Ohio, and raised in Chicago, Illinois. Her mother, Sandra Pressley (née Echols), worked multiple jobs to support the family and also worked as a community organizer for the Chicago Urban League advocating for tenants' rights. Her father, Martin Terrell, struggled with addiction and was incarcerated throughout Pressley's childhood, but eventually earned multiple degrees and taught at the college level. The marriage ended in divorce.

Pressley grew up on the north side of Chicago and attended Francis W. Parker School, where she was a cheerleader, did modeling and voice-over work, appeared in Planned Parenthood bus advertisements, and was a competitive debater. During her senior year of high school, she was voted the "most likely to be mayor of Chicago" and was the commencement speaker for her class.

Pressley's mother later moved to Brooklyn, where she worked as an executive assistant and remarried. When Pressley was elected to the Boston City Council, her mother would often attend the public meetings, wearing a hat that said "Mama Pressley".

From 1992 to 1994, Pressley attended the College of General Studies at Boston University, before leaving school to take a full-time job at the Boston Marriott Copley Place to support her mother, who had lost her job. She took further courses at Boston University Metropolitan College.

Early political career 
After leaving Boston University Metropolitan College, Pressley worked as a district representative for Representative Joseph P. Kennedy II (D−MA), for whom she had interned during college. She became Kennedy's scheduler, then worked as constituency director, before becoming the political director and senior aide for Senator John Kerry (D-Mass.) In 2009, Pressley served as Kerry's political director.

Boston City Council 

Pressley was first elected to the Boston City Council in November 2009. Upon being sworn in on January 4, 2010, she was the first woman of color to serve in the 100-year history of the Boston City Council. The only woman in a field of 15 candidates, Pressley won one of the four at-large spots on the city's 13-member council with nearly 42,000 votes.

In her first year as a City Councilor, Pressley formed the Committee on Healthy Women, Families, and Communities, which addresses issues such as domestic violence, child abuse, and human trafficking. She worked collaboratively with community members to develop a comprehensive sex education and health curriculum which was implemented in Boston Public Schools.

In December 2011, Pressley voted to remove Councilor Chuck Turner, who had been convicted of a felony bribery charge in October, from the City Council. Turner, who is black, had alleged his conviction was racially motivated, and Pressley's vote to remove him from the City Council was seen as causing some backlash to her among the city's black community. Pressley would comment, on her vote, "I would have thought it cowardly to abstain..... I cast the ballot that I did because despite how hard it was, I thought it was the right thing to do in maintaining the integrity of the body and so as not to imperil my agenda."

In June 2014, the Boston City Council unanimously passed an ordinance Pressley coauthored with Michelle Wu, which prohibits its city government "from contracting with any health insurer that denies coverage or 'discriminates in the amount of premium, policy fees, or rates charged...because of gender identity or expression". This ordinance guaranteed healthcare (including gender reassignment surgery, hormone therapy, and mental health services) to transgender city employees and their dependents. Pressley declared, "We can't be a world-class city if anyone is made to feel like a second-class citizen."

Pressley led an effort to pass an ordinance requiring municipal trucks to have side guards to protect cyclists. She worked with Mayor Marty Walsh on an ordinance requiring it. It passed unanimously in the City Council in November 2014.

In 2017, the Council passed the Equity in City of Boston Contracts Ordinance, which was sponsored by Pressley and Michelle Wu. It required that the city create a supplier diversity program to conduct outreach to female and minority-owned businesses in regards to the city contracting process. It also required the city to actively solicit bids from at least one female-owned business and one minority-owned business for contracts under $50,000. It also created a quarterly reporting requirement for the city.

According to Erin O'Brien, a political science professor at University of Massachusetts Boston,  Pressley did not have the reputation for being controversial or an outsider during her time on the City Council.

In the Boston City council election of November 2011, Pressley finished first among at-large candidates with 37,000 votes. She led in 13 of the city's 22 wards and finished second in three others. Pressley won Boston's communities of color and many progressive neighborhoods. In all, she placed first in more than half of Boston's 22 wards. Pressley topped the ticket again in November 2013 and November 2015, and placed second in November 2017.

While on the Boston City Council, Pressley was one of the first notable Massachusetts politicians to endorse Elizabeth Warren's successful campaign in Massachusetts' 2012 U.S. Senate election.

U.S. House of Representatives

Elections

2018 

In January 2018, Pressley announced her challenge to incumbent United States Representative Michael Capuano in the 2018 Democratic primary nomination for the Massachusetts's 7th congressional district. With a Cook Partisan Voting Index of D+34, the 7th is by far the most Democratic district in New England. The GOP has only nominated a candidate in this district five times since longtime Speaker Tip O'Neill retired in 1986.

The 7th district is traditionally Democratic and is the state's only district where the majority of residents are not white. Capuano received endorsements from civil rights veteran and U.S. Representative John Lewis of Georgia as well as U.S. Representative Maxine Waters of California.

Pressley was endorsed by The Boston Globe and local chapter of the hotel and electrical worker union. Grassroots movements including Democracy for America, Brand New Congress and the Justice Democrats supported Pressley. She received the endorsements of former Massachusetts Democratic Party chair John E. Walsh, Massachusetts Attorney General Maura Healey, former Newton mayor Setti Warren and former Boston city councilor Michelle Wu. The nomination win in New York's 14th congressional district of Alexandria Ocasio-Cortez over long-time representative Joseph Crowley increased the visibility of Pressley's campaign. While some political commentators distinguished Pressley's campaign from the one of Ocasio-Cortez as Capuano was understood to have one of the most progressive records in Congress, the incumbents both represented districts in which the majority of voters are not white.

Like Capuano, Pressley campaigned as a staunch progressive, admitting that her voting record would likely be almost identical to Capuano's. However, Pressley contended that a reliably liberal voting record was not enough to meet the needs of a district whose demographics and character had changed over the years. She also claimed that the district needed to be represented by someone who would take a more aggressive role in opposing the presidency of Donald Trump. She campaigned with the slogan "change can't wait", and promised that she would bring "activist leadership".

In the September 4, 2018, Democratic primary election, Pressley defeated Capuano by a margin of 59% to 41%. The primary victory was a surprise, as the last poll before the election showed Capuano with a significant lead, 48% to 35%. Part of the reason the polls may have been inaccurate was a surge in the number of primary voters. According to Boston NPR station WBUR, 24 percent of primary voters in the 7th district primary had not voted in the five previous primaries. The percentage of new voters included a disproportionate number of Hispanic and Asian voters. She won the general election unopposed, though the Democratic primary in her district is seen as tantamount to election.

2020 

Pressley was unopposed for the Democratic nomination. Rayla Campbell, a claims adjuster and occupational zoning activist from Randolph, mounted a write-in campaign as a Republican. Pressley won the election.

2022 
Presley defeated Republican Donnie Palmer in the general election.

Tenure 

Pressley is the first black woman elected to represent Massachusetts in Congress. With the November election victory of Jahana Hayes in Connecticut's 5th congressional district, they are the first women of color to be elected to Congress from New England.

Pressley is a member of the informal group known as "The Squad", whose members form a unified front to push for progressive changes such as the Green New Deal and Medicare-for-all. The other original members of "The Squad" are Ilhan Omar (D-MN), Rashida Tlaib (D-MI), and Alexandria Ocasio-Cortez (D-NY). Pressley is the oldest and most politically experienced of the four, and she was asked by the group to act as their spokesperson after then-President Donald J. Trump attacked them.

In an interview with The Boston Globe in July 2019, Pressley said her office received death threats after President Trump's tweets on July 14, 2019, and in general since her election.

In May 2019, Pressley gave the commencement address to the graduates of University of Massachusetts Boston, saying they are "President Trump's worst nightmare". In her speech, she said, "Represented here today are dreamers and doers, immigrants, people of every race identity, every gender identity and sexuality, sisters rocking Senegalese twists and hijabs."

On September 17, 2019, Pressley filed a resolution that called for the House Judiciary Committee to launch impeachment proceedings against Supreme Court Justice Brett Kavanaugh.

In November 2019, Pressley introduced a criminal justice reform resolution that called for decriminalizing consensual sex work, abolishing cash bail, legalizing marijuana, abolishing capital punishment and solitary confinement, and shrinking the U.S. prison population by greater than 80 percent. The house resolution was called The People's Justice Guarantee.

In July, 2021, Pressley joined Cori Bush and Ilhan Omar in sleeping on the steps of the U.S. Capitol to protest the expiration of the eviction moratorium during the COVID-19 pandemic in the United States.

On November 5, 2021, Pressley was one of six House Democrats who broke with their party and voted against the Infrastructure Investment and Jobs Act, as it was decoupled from the social safety net provisions in the Build Back Better Act.

Committee assignments 
 Committee on Financial Services
 Subcommittee on Consumer Protection and Financial Institutions
 Subcommittee on Diversity and Inclusion
 Committee on Oversight and Reform
 Subcommittee on Economic and Consumer Policy
 Subcommittee on Civil Rights and Civil Liberties

Caucus memberships 
 Congressional Black Caucus
 Congressional Caucus for Women's Issues
 Congressional Progressive Caucus
Future of Transportation Caucus (Founding co-chair)
Congressional LGBTQ+ Equality Caucus

Political positions

Healthcare 
Pressley is an advocate of Medicare for All.

In May 2019, Pressley and Senator Cory Booker introduced the Healthy MOMMIES Act, legislation that would expand Medicaid coverage in an attempt to provide comprehensive prenatal, labor, and postpartum care with an extension of the Medicaid pregnancy pathway from 60 days to a full year following birth for the purpose of assuring new mothers have access to services unrelated to pregnancy. The bill also directed Medicaid and the Children's Health Insurance Program's Payment and Access Commission report its data regarding doula care coverage under state Medicaid programs and subsequently develop strategies aimed at improving access to doula care.

Civil liberties 
Pressley has supported the U.S. national anthem protests, which have been used to bring attention to the disproportionate rate of which police brutality affects black people.

On March 5, 2019, Pressley proposed lowering the voting age from 18 years old to 16 in an amendment she introduced in Congress. This was her first amendment on the House floor and was intended to amend the For the People Act of 2019. Her amendment was defeated 305–126–2, with a slight majority of the Democrats and one Republican voting in favor.

On December 5, 2019, Pressley, Cory Booker, and Representatives Cedric Richmond, Marcia Fudge, and Barbara Lee introduced the Create a Respectful and Open World for Natural Hair (CROWN) Act to ban discrimination based on hair textures and hairstyles that are commonly associated with a particular race or national origin.

Immigration 
In June 2018, Pressley called for the defunding of U.S. Immigration and Customs Enforcement, saying the law enforcement agency poses an "existential threat" to immigrant communities. In June 2019, Pressley was one of four Democratic representatives to vote against the Emergency Supplemental Appropriations for Humanitarian Assistance and Security at the Southern Border Act (H.R. 3401), a $4.5 billion border funding bill sponsored by Nita Lowey that required Customs and Border Protection enact health standards for individuals in custody such as forming standards for individuals for "medical emergencies; nutrition, hygiene, and facilities; and personnel training."

Sexual violence and sex work 
In 2018, Pressley said that she would make ending sexual violence a major priority of her work in Congress.

Pressley supports decriminalizing sex work, saying it "would improve the health and safety of sex workers and put them on the path to greater stability." She argued that sex work is the only work available to some marginalized people, especially transgender women of color, and that they would be less at risk if they could self advocate and report unlawful acts committed against them.

Labor 
On April 9, 2019, Pressley was one of four House Democrats to introduce the Be HEARD Act, legislation intended to abolish the tipped minimum wage along with ending mandatory arbitration and pre-employment nondisclosure agreements. The bill would also give workers additional time to report harassment.

Foreign policy 
On July 23, 2019, Pressley voted in favor of H. Res. 246, a House Resolution introduced by Illinois Congressman Brad Schneider that formally condemns the Boycott, Divestment, and Sanctions movement against Israel. The resolution passed 398–17; Pressley was the only member of "the Squad" to vote in favor of it. On September 23 Pressley was one of eight Democrats to vote against the funding of Israel's Iron Dome missile defense system.

Speaking at a fundraiser with Ilhan Omar in Somerville, Massachusetts, Pressley condemned the 2020 Baghdad International Airport airstrike that killed Iranian general Qasem Soleimani, saying: "It is consistent with the impulsive, reckless, short-sighted foreign policy of the occupant of this White House who I think proceeds as if he's engaging in a game of Battleship and does not prioritize diplomacy."

In 2023, Pressley was among 56 Democrats to vote in favor of H.Con.Res. 21 which directed President Joe Biden to remove U.S. troops from Syria within 180 days.

Student loan forgiveness
In early February 2021, Pressley supported a plan to cancel up to $50,000 in student loan debt for approximately 44 million Americans who have federal student loans. She has asked President Biden to forgive this debt by using executive order rather than going through the legislative process that would likely get bogged down in partisanship. Pressley told The Boston Globe, "It's about an equitable economic recovery. If people really do believe that Black Lives Matter, then the only receipts that matter in this moment are budgets and policies."

Presidential primary endorsements

During the 2016 Democratic Party presidential primaries, Pressley endorsed Hillary Clinton.

In November 2019, Pressley endorsed Senator Elizabeth Warren for president ahead of the 2020 Democratic Party presidential primaries. This set Pressley apart from the other three members of "The Squad", who had endorsed Bernie Sanders. Pressley, who was named one of Warren's three national co-chairs, became a prominent surrogate on the campaign circuit. After Warren's withdrawal, Pressley did not transfer her support to Joe Biden or Bernie Sanders until the time of the Democratic National Convention, when she endorsed Biden for president.

Criminal justice reform 
Pressley is a supporter of prison reform and supports programs for prisoner reentry that starts well before an inmate has been released from incarceration. In 2020, Pressley's husband, who spent ten years in prison, testified before the United States House Judiciary Subcommittee on Crime, Terrorism and Homeland Security saying "All the other things that organizations can offer, like identification cards, are important, but it all starts with where you lay your head at night." In the autumn of 2019, Pressley introduced a resolution calling for an overhaul of the criminal justice system called the People's Justice Guarantee.

In early June 2020, Pressley and Libertarian representative Justin Amash introduced the End Qualified Immunity Act. The act would remove from law enforcement officers, and other officials, the protection of qualified immunity that had routinely protected them from prosecution when they could claim that acts that would otherwise trigger criminal charges had been committed as part of performing their official duties.

Public transit and infrastructure
Pressley advocates for making public transit fare-free for users. In 2020, she co-authored the Freedom to Move Act with Senator Ed Markey, which would have offered $5 billion in annual competitive grants to transit agencies that offer fare-free transit access.

On November 5, 2021, Pressley was one of six House Democrats who broke with their party and voted with a majority of Republicans against the Infrastructure Investment and Jobs Act, a $1.2trillion infrastructure spending bill.

Voting age
In January 2023, Pressley was one of 13 cosponsors of an amendment to the Constitution of the United States extending the right to vote to citizens sixteen years of age or older.

Honors and awards 
 2012: Aspen-Rodel Fellow in Public Leadership, Class of 2012
 2012: Truman National Security Project Partner
 2014: Greater Boston Chamber of Commerce, 10 Outstanding Young Leaders
 2014: Victim Rights Law Center, Leadership Award
 2015: Boston magazine, 50 Most Powerful People
 2015: EMILY's List, Gabby Giffords Rising Star Award
 2016: The New York Times, 14 Young Democrats to Watch
 2018: Boston magazine, 100 Most Influential People in Boston, #20
 2020: Children's HealthWatch Champion
2021: Doctor of Laws, Honoris Causa from Simmons University

Electoral history

2018

2020

Personal life

Pressley lives in Boston's Dorchester neighborhood with her husband, Conan Harris, and her stepdaughter.
In January 2019, her husband resigned from his position as a senior public safety adviser at Boston City Hall to form his own consulting firm, Conan Harris & Associates.

Pressley has stated that she is a "woman of faith" who "grew up in the church" and she is the granddaughter of a Baptist preacher. She has been public about her experience as a survivor of child sexual abuse, and was also reportedly sexually assaulted while a student at Boston University.

In January 2020, Pressley revealed that she had been diagnosed with alopecia areata, resulting in the loss of all of her hair; she said in a public announcement, "I want to be freed from the secret and the shame that that secret carries with it."

Pressley is a member of the nonprofit social and service organization The Links.

See also
 List of African-American United States representatives
 Women in the United States House of Representatives

References

Further reading

External links 

 Congresswoman Ayanna Pressley official U.S. House website
 Ayanna Pressley for Congress

 Ayanna Pressley at City of Boston
 

1974 births
Living people
20th-century African-American people
20th-century African-American women
21st-century American politicians
21st-century African-American women
21st-century American women politicians
African-American city council members in Massachusetts
African-American members of the United States House of Representatives
African-American women in politics
Baptists from Massachusetts
Baptists from the United States
Boston City Council members
Boston University alumni
Christians from Illinois
Christians from Massachusetts
Democratic Party members of the United States House of Representatives from Massachusetts
Female members of the United States House of Representatives
Francis W. Parker School (Chicago) alumni
Left-wing populism in the United States
People with alopecia universalis
Politicians from Chicago
Prison reformers
Women city councillors in Massachusetts